Forest City is an unincorporated community in Barber County, Kansas, United States.

History
A post office called Forest operated from 1908 until 1919.

References

Further reading

External links
 Barber County maps: Current, Historic, KDOT

Unincorporated communities in Barber County, Kansas
Unincorporated communities in Kansas